Frits Goodings (10 October 1963 – 7 June 1989) was a Dutch footballer who played for FC Utrecht and FC Wageningen. He died at the age of 25, when on 7 June 1989 he was killed in the Surinam Airways Flight PY764 air crash in Paramaribo.

Career 
Goodings was born Paramaribo. He played in the youth teams of FC Utrecht alongside his friend, Edu Nandlal. His first professional contract was signed at FC Wageningen.

Death 
Both Goodings and Nandlal were invited by Sonny Hasnoe, the founder of the Colourful 11 to be part of the team travelling to Suriname to play in the "Boxel Kleurrijk Tournament" with three Surinamese teams. The Surinam Airways Flight PY764 crashed during approach to Paramaribo-Zanderij International Airport, killing 176 of the 187 on board, making it the worst ever aviation disaster in Suriname's history. Gooding was among the 15 members of the 18-man Colourful 11 contingent to be killed; only three of them survived, of which Edu Nandlal was one.

His father, Frits Goodings, Sr., only found his empty wallet in the woods around Paramaribo at the location of the crash. It was said the victims were robbed from their personal belongings just after the crash.

References
 Goodings at AndroKnel.nl 
 Crash report
 Eindbestemming Zanderij, nu.nl 
 Iwan Tol: Eindbesteming Zanderij; het vergeten verhaal van het Kleurrijk Elftal 

1963 births
1989 deaths
Dutch footballers
Dutch sportspeople of Surinamese descent
FC Utrecht players
FC Wageningen players
Eerste Divisie players
Association footballers not categorized by position
Footballers killed in the Surinam Airways Flight 764 crash